Byron Donnell Beams (September 8, 1935 – November 14, 1992) was an American football defensive and offensive tackle who played professionally in the National Football League (NFL) and the American Football League (AFL). He played college football at Notre Dame. Beams was a  20th round selection (232nd overall pick) of the Los Angeles Rams in the 1957 NFL Draft. He played in the NFL for the Pittsburgh Steelers in 1959–1960 and in the AFL for the league champion Houston Oilers in 1961.

See also
List of American Football League players

References

1935 births
1992 deaths
People from Konawa, Oklahoma
Players of American football from Oklahoma
American football offensive tackles
American football defensive tackles
Notre Dame Fighting Irish football players
Notre Dame Fighting Irish men's track and field athletes
Pittsburgh Steelers players
Houston Oilers players
American Football League players